Ivo Linna (born 12 June 1949 in Kuressaare) is an Estonian singer.

Eurovision Song Contest and Eesti Laul
He represented Estonia alongside Maarja Liis Ilus in the Eurovision Song Contest 1996 in Oslo with the song "Kaelakee Hääl" (The Sound of a Necklace) which finished 5th at the contest. 

He competed in Eesti Laul 2017 with the song "Suur Loterii" (Big Lottery). The song won its semi final, but came fifth of ten entries in the final round.

Together with his son Robert Linna and the Estonian band Supernova, Ivo participated in Eesti Laul 2021 with the song "Ma Olen Siin" (I'm Here). The song finished in eleventh place of the twelve entries in the final round.

Personal life

In 2000, the President of Estonia decorated Linna with a IV Class Order of the White Star.

Discography
Solo Albums
Ivo Linna '93 (1993)
Iff 1 (1998)
Enne ja pärast päeva (2001)
Üksi, iseendas üksi... (2006)

In addition to the albums mentioned above, Ivo Linna has released more albums with different rock acts of Estonia, like Apelsin and Rock Hotel.

References

External links

 

1949 births
Living people
Estonian pop singers
21st-century Estonian male singers
Eurovision Song Contest entrants of 1996
Eurovision Song Contest entrants for Estonia
20th-century Estonian male singers
Recipients of the Order of the White Star, 4th Class
People from Kuressaare
Eesti Laul contestants